The Eaglehawk Football Netball Club is an Australian rules football and netball club based in the town of Eaglehawk, Victoria and have competed in every BFL season since the league began in 1880, with the exception of 1904. Eaglehawk teams currently compete in the Bendigo Football Netball League (BFNL).

Eaglehawk drew level with Sandhurst in 2007 when they won their 26th premiership. The following year they were premiers again, setting a new league record. Eaglehawk have won the most senior football premierships in the BFNL with 28.

Senior Football Premieships
 Bendigo Football League (28): 
1882, 1883, 1886, 1887, 1889 
1894, 1895, 1896, 1897, 1898 
1901, 1903, 1906, 1908 
1922, 1924 
1935 
1941, 1946 
1953, 1957 
1968 
1971 
1980, 1982 
2007, 2008 
2018

VFL / AFL players
The following footballers played with Eaglehawk prior to making their senior VFL / AFL debut. 
1907 - Charlie Clymo (St Kilda player & Geelong coach)
1936 - Almond Richards - Essendon
1951 - Peter Pianto (Geelong Team of the Century member)
1973 - Rod Ashman (Carlton Team of the Century member)
1980 - Des English (Carlton premiership player 1981 & 1982)
2008 - Jarryn Geary (St Kilda Football Club)
2013 - Jake Stringer - Footscray & Essendon (Footscray premiership player - 2016)

References

External links
 Official website

Sports clubs established in 1880
Australian rules football clubs established in 1880
Bendigo Football League clubs
1880 establishments in Australia
Netball teams in Victoria (Australia)